Laura Enever is an Australian professional surfer. Enever was the ASP Women's World Junior Champion in 2009. She made her professional debut in 2011.

As of March 2015, Enever competes at the highest level of professional surfing, touring with the World Surf League. She finished 10th in final standings for the 2014 Women's Samsung Galaxy Championship Tour.

Surf Career Highlights
 2016 Tied for 4th at the Pe’ahi Women's Challenge
 2015 Hurley Australian Open of Surfing
 2009 ASP Women's World Junior Champion
 2009 Billabong Pro Junior Coffs Harbour
 2008 ISA Junior World Champion
 2008 Triple Crown Rookie of the Year

References

External links

Surfer Girls - Laura Enever

1991 births
World Surf League surfers
Australian female surfers
Living people
Sportswomen from New South Wales
Sportspeople from Sydney